Monitor Latino (stylised monitorLATINO) is a singles chart founded in 2003 which ranks songs on chart based on airplay across radio stations in Argentina, as in most Latin American countries and Hispanic radio stations in the United States, using the Radio Tracking Data, LLC in real time. Monitor Latino launched in Argentina in June, 2016, providing four different charts: the Argentina Top 20 (general airplay), the Argentina National Top 20 (local songs only), the Argentina Anglo Top 20 (music in English only), and the Argentina Latin Top 20 (music in Spanish only). Initially, the Argentine Monitor Latino charts were based purely on spins (the number of times a song is played). In March 2021, side charts based on audience (the number of people that listen to a song while it is being played) were also launched.

Argentina Airplay
This is a list of the number-one hits from 2016 onwards on the Argentina Airplay chart, ranked by Monitor Latino.

 – Number-one single of the year

Spins

Audience

Argentina National Songs
This is a list of the number-one Argentine hits of the 2010s on the Argentina National Airplay chart, ranked by Monitor Latino.

 – Number-one single of the year
 – Number-one single of the following year

Spins

Audience

Argentina Anglo Airplay
This is a list of the number-one English-language hits of the 2010s on the Argentina Anglo chart, ranked by Monitor Latino.

Spins
 – Number-one single of the year
 – Number-one single of the following year

Audience

Notes 
Justin Bieber started being credited as a featured artist from the week of April 24, 2017.
Farruko started being credited as artist from the week of February 11, 2019.
Shakira started being credited as artist from the week of October 21, 2019.

References

Argentina
2010s